Ruggero Riva (born 24 July 1990) is an Italian professional football player who plays for Serie D club Franciacorta.

Club career
On 15 January 2019, he signed with AlbinoLeffe.

On 1 July 2022, Riva joined Serie D club Franciacorta.

Honours

Club 
Tritium Calcio
Serie D: 2009–10
Lega Pro Seconda Divisione: 2010–11

Monza
Serie D: 2016–17

References

1990 births
People from Ponte San Pietro
Sportspeople from the Province of Bergamo
Living people
Italian footballers
Association football defenders
Tritium Calcio 1908 players
A.C. Renate players
A.C. Monza players
U.C. AlbinoLeffe players
Serie C players
Serie D players
Footballers from Lombardy